Tayqan and Tayeqan may refer to:

Tayeqan, Markazi
Tayqan, Qom